David Martin McIntosh  (born June 8, 1958) is an American attorney and Republican Party politician who served as the U.S. representative for Indiana's 2nd congressional district from 1995 to 2001. He is a co-founder of two conservative political groups, The Federalist Society and The Club for Growth.

McIntosh was the Republican nominee for Governor of Indiana in 2000, losing to Democratic incumbent Frank O'Bannon. He was an unsuccessful candidate for the Republican nomination in Indiana's 5th congressional district in 2012.

Early life, education, and law career
McIntosh was born in Oakland, California, the son of Jean Marie (Slough), a judge, and Norman McIntosh. He moved to his mother's hometown of Kendallville, Indiana, at age five after his father died.

McIntosh attended Yale University, where he was a member and later president of the Yale Political Union and, despite his political orientation, its Progressive Party. He graduated with a B.A. (cum laude) in 1980, and later received a J.D. from University of Chicago Law School in 1983. McIntosh was taught at Chicago by Antonin Scalia, who later became a Supreme Court Justice. He is also a co-founder of The Federalist Society.

Early political career

During the Reagan Administration, McIntosh served as Special Assistant to the Attorney General and as Special Assistant to the President for Domestic Affairs.

In George H. W. Bush's administration, he served as executive director of Vice President Dan Quayle's Council for Competitiveness. In that role, he emphasized limiting or rolling back environmental regulations that the Council saw as inimical to economic growth – such as a redraft of the Clean Air Act which would allow for companies to increase pollution emissions without notifying the public.

U.S. House of Representatives

Elections
1994
Incumbent Democrat U.S. Congressman Philip Sharp of Indiana's 2nd congressional district decided to retire. McIntosh decided to run and won the Republican primary with a plurality of 43% in a four candidate field. In the general election, he defeated Democratic Secretary of State of Indiana Joe Hogsett 54%–46%.

1996
He won re-election to a second term with 58% of the vote.

1998
He won re-election to a third term with 61% of the vote.

Tenure
McIntosh fought against U.S. Senator Bob Dole to get rid of regulations within the health and food industries.

After Newt Gingrich resigned as Speaker of the United States House of Representatives, McIntosh thought about running himself. He decided not to run and endorsed William Reynolds Archer, Jr.

Committee assignments
He was a member of the House Oversight and Government Reform Committee and was Chairman of the House Oversight and Reform subcommittee.

2000 gubernatorial election

In 2000, McIntosh ran for Governor of Indiana, but lost to incumbent Democrat Frank O'Bannon, 57 percent to 42 percent. His campaign was built around a 25 percent guaranteed property tax cut, but he never provided details on how he would accomplish it.

Post-congressional career
Since 2001, McIntosh has been a partner in the global law firm of Mayer Brown. In 2009, he served as a political advisor to conservative lobby groups on Sonia Sotomayor's nomination to the Supreme Court.

2004 gubernatorial election

He planned another run for governor in 2004, but dropped out before the Indiana Republican primary after President George W. Bush gave his support to Mitch Daniels, former Director of the White House Office of Management and Budget.

2012 congressional election

In 2012 McIntosh announced his candidacy for Congress, running in the newly redrawn Indiana's 5th Congressional district, held by retiring Republican Dan Burton. He was narrowly defeated in the primary by former U.S. Attorney Susan Brooks, losing to her by 1,010 votes out of over 100,000 votes cast.

Club for Growth
In December 2014, McIntosh was named the head of the Club for Growth. On November 7, 2020, on behalf of the Club for Growth, McIntosh was a signatory to a message communicated by Sen. Mike Lee to White House Chief of Staff, Mark Meadows, expressing unequivocal support for Donald Trump following his loss in the 2020 election to Joe Biden and urging President Trump "to exhaust every legal and constitutional remedy at [his] disposal to restore Americans faith in our elections."

Electoral history

References

External links

 
 David McIntosh On the Issues

|-

|-

|-

|-

|-

1958 births
Living people
Federalist Society members
People from Kendallville, Indiana
Politicians from Oakland, California
University of Chicago Law School alumni
Yale University alumni
Republican Party members of the United States House of Representatives from Indiana
People associated with Mayer Brown
Members of Congress who became lobbyists